Verkhnekamsky District is an administrative and municipal district (raion), one of the thirty-nine in Kirov Oblast, Russia. It is located in the northeast of the oblast. Its administrative center is the town of Kirs. Population:  39,643 (2002 Census);  The population of Kirs accounts for 31.9% of the district's total population.

Economy and transportation
The Dymnoye peat narrow-gauge railway for hauling peat operates in the district.

References

Notes

Sources

Districts of Kirov Oblast